Lilija Eugenija Jasiūnaitė  (born 1944 in Panevėžys) is a Lithuanian painter and textile artist. Her work has been shown at exhibitions in Lithuania, Russia, Sweden, and Germany.

References
 Dailininkai. Panevėžio miesto savivaldybė (Government of the City of Panevėžys). Accessed 2010-11-19.

See also
List of Lithuanian painters

Lithuanian painters
1944 births
Living people
Jasiunaite
20th-century Lithuanian women artists
21st-century Lithuanian women artists
Women textile artists